Andrzej Mieczysław Adamczyk (born 4 January 1959) is a Polish politician, and the current Minister of Infrastructure and Construction in the cabinet of Beata Szydło, serving since 2015. He was elected to the Sejm on 25 September 2005, getting 1,582 votes in 13 Kraków district, as a candidate on the Law and Justice list.

See also
Members of Polish Sejm 2005-2007

External links
Andrzej Adamczyk, The Sejm of Poland

1959 births
Living people
People from Kraków County
Law and Justice politicians
Members of the Polish Sejm 2005–2007
Members of the Polish Sejm 2007–2011
Members of the Polish Sejm 2011–2015
Members of the Polish Sejm 2015–2019
Members of the Polish Sejm 2019–2023